This is a list of newspapers named the Press.

United States
 The Press, a former name of The Press-Enterprise, Riverside, California
 The Ridgefield Press, Ridgefield, Connecticut, published weekly
 The Grand Rapids Press, Grand Rapids, Michigan
 The Oakland Press, Oakland County, Michigan
 The Press of Atlantic City, Atlantic City, New Jersey
 Riverdale Press, Bronx, New York City, New York, a weekly publication
 The Dickinson Press, Dickinson, North Dakota
 Cleveland Press, Cleveland, Ohio, published from 1876 to 1982
 The Philadelphia Press, Philadelphia, Pennsylvania, published from 1857 to 1920
 The Pittsburgh Press, a historic newspaper in Pittsburgh, Pennsylvania, that ceased publication in 1991
 The Sheboygan Press, Sheboygan, Wisconsin

Elsewhere
 The Press, online student newspaper produced by SAIT Polytechnic, Calgary, Alberta, Canada
 The Press (York), an English regional newspaper
 Guernsey Press, the only daily newspaper in Guernsey
 The Irish Press, an Irish national newspaper from 1931 to 1995
 The Press'', published in Christchurch, New Zealand
 Press (Belgrade newspaper), published in Serbia between 2005 and 2012

See also
 Daily Press (disambiguation)

Lists of newspapers